Captain Mikula, the Kid (Kapetan Mikula Mali) is a Croatian film directed by Obrad Gluščević. It was released in 1974.

External links
 

1974 films
1970s Croatian-language films
Jadran Film films
Croatian children's films
Croatian war films
War films set in Partisan Yugoslavia
Fictional Yugoslav Partisans
Croatian World War II films
Yugoslav World War II films